The 2022 Billie Jean King Cup Qualifying Round was played on 15 and 16 April 2022. The nine winners of this round will qualify for the 2022 Billie Jean King Cup Finals.

Teams
Eighteen teams played for nine spots in the Finals, in series decided on a home and away basis.

These eighteen teams were:
 10 teams ranked 3rd-12th in the 2020–21 Billie Jean King Cup Finals,
 7 winners of the 2020–21 Billie Jean King Cup Play-offs,
 1 loser of the 2020–21 Billie Jean King Cup Play-offs, based on rankings

The 9 winning teams of the qualifying round will play at the Finals and the 9 losing teams will play at the play-offs in November 2022.

Following the suspension of the Russian Tennis Federation (RTF) and Belarus Tennis Federation (BTF) from ITF membership and from participation in ITF international team competitions on 1 March 2022, Australia will replace RTF (who had qualified automatically as 2021 champions) in the 2022 Finals. The Qualifier tie between Australia and Slovakia scheduled for 15-16 April will therefore not be played. Both Slovakia and Belgium receiving a bye to the 2022 Finals.

#: Nations ranking as of 8 November 2021.

Seeded teams
  (#1)
  (#2)
  (#4)
  (#5)
  (#7)
  (#9)
  (#10)
  (#11)

Unseeded teams:
  (#12)
  (#13)
  (#14)
  (#15)
  (#16)
  (#17)
  (#19)
  (#24)
  (#46)

Results summary

Details of results

Italy vs. France 

Team nominations: 
: Camila Giorgi, Jasmine Paolini, Martina Trevisan, Lucia Bronzetti, Elisabetta Cocciaretto 
: Alizé Cornet, Harmony Tan, Océane Dodin, Kristina Mladenovic

United States vs. Ukraine 

Team nominations: 
: Jessica Pegula, Shelby Rogers, Alison Riske, Asia Muhammad, Desirae Krawczyk 
: Dayana Yastremska, Katarina Zavatska, Lyudmyla Kichenok, Nadiia Kichenok

Czech Republic vs. Great Britain 

Team nominations: 
: Markéta Vondroušová, Tereza Martincová, Karolína Muchová, Marie Bouzková, Linda Fruhvirtová 
: Emma Raducanu, Harriet Dart, Katie Swan, Sonay Kartal

Kazakhstan vs. Germany 

Team nominations: 
: Elena Rybakina, Yulia Putintseva, Zarina Diyas, Anna Danilina, Zhibek Kulambayeva 
: Angelique Kerber,  Jule Niemeier, Anna-Lena Friedsam, Laura Siegemund

Canada vs. Latvia 

Team nominations: 
: Leylah Fernandez, Rebecca Marino, Françoise Abanda, Gabriela Dabrowski, Carol Zhao 
: Daniela Vismane, Diāna Marcinkēviča, Darja Semenistaja, Līga Dekmeijere

Netherlands vs. Spain 

Team nominations: 
: Arantxa Rus, Lesley Pattinama Kerkhove, Arianne Hartono, Demi Schuurs 
: Sara Sorribes Tormo, Nuria Párrizas Díaz, Rebeka Masarova, Aliona Bolsova

Poland vs. Romania 

Team nominations: 
: Iga Świątek, Magda Linette, Magdalena Fręch, Maja Chwalińska, Alicja Rosolska 
: Irina-Camelia Begu, Mihaela Buzărnescu, Andreea Mitu, Andreea Prisăcariu

Notes

References

Qualifying Round
Billie Jean King Cup
Billie Jean King Cup
Billie Jean King Cup